de Zwart is a Dutch surname, meaning "the black (one)", usually having referred to dark hair. Variant forms include De Swart, De Swarte and De Zwarte. People with these names include:

De Zwart
Erik de Zwart (born 1957), Dutch media entrepreneur
Martijn de Zwart (born 1990), Dutch footballer
Pieter de Zwart (born 1944), Dutch Olympic sailor
Willem de Zwart (1862–1931), Dutch painter, engraver, and watercolorist
De Swart
Henriette de Swart (born 1961), Dutch linguist
De Swarte
Michelle de Swarte (born 1980), English model and TV presenter
Vincent de Swarte (1963–2006), French novelist
De Zwarte
Piet de Zwarte (born 1990), Dutch water polo player
Deswarte
Hilda Deswarte (fl. 1928), Belgian fencer
Sylvie Deswarte-Rosa (born 1945), Portuguese art historian

See also
Zwart, Dutch surname

References

Dutch-language surnames